was a Japanese politician. He was governor of Saga Prefecture (1898-1901), Gunma Prefecture (1901-1902) and Nagano Prefecture (1902-1905).

Awards
1907 - Order of the Rising Sun

References

1853 births
1934 deaths
Governors of Saga Prefecture
Governors of Yamanashi Prefecture
Governors of Nagano
Governors of Okayama Prefecture
Recipients of the Order of the Rising Sun